Saranac Lake may refer to:

 Saranac Lake, New York, a village in the northern Adirondacks
One of the three nearby Saranac Lakes, part of the Saranac River:
Upper Saranac Lake
Middle Saranac Lake
Lower Saranac Lake
Note: There is no lake named "Saranac Lake," so the name can properly refer only to the village of Saranac Lake.

See also
Saranac, New York, a village thirty miles northeast of Saranac Lake, on the Saranac River.